Aletter is a surname. Notable people with the surname include:

 Frank Aletter (1926–2009), American actor
 Karl Aletter (1906–1991), German rower